is a railway station on the Kyoto Line in Seika, Kyoto, Japan, operated by the private railway operator Kintetsu Railway.

Lines
Komada Station is served by the Kyoto Line.

Layout
The station has two four-car long side platforms, serving two tracks. Entrances are located on the south and north sides of the northbound platform and connected to the southbound platform via an underground passage. An additional exit is provided on weekday mornings for Kyoto Kogakkan High School students on the south side of the southbound platform, and is also opened at other times for wheelchair users.

Platforms

Adjacent stations

History
The station opened on 3 November 1928, as a station on the Nara Electric Railroad. In 1963, the NER merged with Kintetsu.

Surrounding area
Shimokoma Station (JR West Gakkentoshi Line)
Kyoto Kogakkan High School

See also
 List of railway stations in Japan

External links

 Kintetsu station information 

Railway stations in Kyoto Prefecture
Railway stations in Japan opened in 1928